Jason-Shane Scott (born December 29, 1976) is an American actor.

Life and career 

Scott was born in Southern California. At the age of two he moved to Reno, Nevada with his mother and older sister while making frequent trips to Los Angeles to visit his father. Scott attended Wooster High School and excelled at sports, playing baseball, basketball and football. His football talent earned him particular recognition; his team won the state championship and Scott himself was offered numerous football scholarships. Upon graduation, Scott chose to pursue an acting career and moved back to Los Angeles. Enrolled in acting classes, he began studying intensely. He also took up modeling and spent several months in Europe.

Upon his return to the United States, he appeared in such films as Shrieker, Until Death, A Turn in the Tree, Caught and Billy's Hollywood Screen Kiss, as well as the Aerosmith videos for "Love Is Hard on your Knees" and "Hole in My Soul". In 1998 he tested for and won the role of troubled teenager Will Rappaport on the daytime serial One Life to Live and moved to New York City. For this portrayal, he received two Soap Opera Digest Award nominations: 1999, Outstanding Male Newcomer; 2000, Outstanding Younger Leading Actor. Scott's three years on OLTL allowed him to polish his acting further as he was given a chain of challenging storylines. In 2001, he left OLTL and New York and returned to Los Angeles.  Since then, he has appeared in such films as Wolves of Wall Street (2003), Latter Days (2004) and Starship Troopers 2: Hero of the Federation (2004) and guest starred on such shows as the Lifetime drama For the People (2002), NBC's Scrubs and CBS's CSI: Crime Scene Investigation. Scott has also made a few brief returns to One Life to Live since his departure in 2001, most recently in September 2007. He has appeared on CBS's The Young and the Restless and has co-starred with Brittany Powell in Soapnet's One Minute Soap titled "Too Late".

Filmography

Film

Television

External links
Jason-Shane Scott's official Web site

Jason-Shane Scott Chats With Soaps.com
Bio at SoapCentral.com

1976 births
Living people
Actors from Reno, Nevada
American male film actors
20th-century American male actors
21st-century American male actors
Male actors from Nevada